The Mnanzini nothobranch (Nothobranchius willerti) is a species of killifish in the family Nothobranchiidae. It is endemic to Kenya where it occurs on the floodplains of the lower Tana River system where it is found in temporary waterbodies and connecting streams. The specific name honours the German aquarist Manfred Willert who helped to collect the type and who donated it to Rudolf Hans Wildekamp who describe the species in 1992.

References

Fish described in 1992
Mnanzini nothobranch
Endemic freshwater fish of Kenya
Taxonomy articles created by Polbot